At least five ships of the Imperial Russian Navy and one ship of the Russian Coast Guard have been named Oryol (Eagle). The name is often rendered in English-language sources as Orel, but this is a poor transliteration of the Cyrillic.

  - frigate destroyed at Astrakhan by rebels in 1670
  - 74-gun ship of the line that fought in the Napoleonic Wars and was scrapped in 1833
  - 74-gun ship of the line scrapped in 1848
  - 84-gun ship of the line converted to steam power while still under construction
  -  pre-dreadnought battleship captured by Japan during the Battle of Tsushima in 1905
  - Nerey-class (Krivak III) frigate of the Russian Coast Guard, former Imeni XXVII siezda KPSS.

Russian Navy ship names